Gwyther is a surname. Notable people with the surname include:

Christine Gwyther (born 1959), Welsh politician
Dave Gwyther (born 1948), Welsh footballer
Elwyn Gwyther (1921–1996), Welsh rugby union and rugby league footballer
William Gwyther (1866–1940), Scottish Anglican priest